Shamil Askhabovich Gasanov (born 30 July 1993) is a Russian football player. He plays as a centre back for Surkhon Termez.

Club career
He made his debut in the Russian Second Division for FC Podolye Podolsky district on 11 October 2012 in a game against FC Metallurg-Oskol Stary Oskol.

He made his Russian Premier League debut for FC Anzhi Makhachkala on 18 October 2015 in a game against FC Krasnodar.

On 15 August 2017, he moved to Norway, signing with Tromsø until December 2017 with an option for a 3-year extension. He returned to Russia without playing any games in Norway and signed with FC Yenisey Krasnoyarsk in February 2018.

On 16 February 2019 he joined Baltika Kaliningrad on loan until the end of the 2018–19 season.

References

External links
 Career summary by sportbox.ru  
 

1993 births
Footballers from Makhachkala
Living people
Russian footballers
Association football defenders
FC Anzhi Makhachkala players
Tromsø IL players
FC Yenisey Krasnoyarsk players
FC Baltika Kaliningrad players
FC Chayka Peschanokopskoye players
FC Dynamo Makhachkala players
Russian Premier League players
Russian First League players
Russian Second League players
Russian expatriate footballers
Expatriate footballers in Norway
Russian expatriate sportspeople in Norway